Hotel Continental is a 1932 American Pre-Code crime film directed by Christy Cabanne and starring Peggy Shannon, Theodore von Eltz and J. Farrell MacDonald. Various criminals search for loot stashed in a luxury hotel which is about to close.

Partial cast
 Peggy Shannon as Ruth Carleton  
 Theodore von Eltz as Jim Bennett 
 J. Farrell MacDonald as Detective Martin  
 Henry B. Walthall as Winthrop  
 Alan Mowbray as Walter Underwood  
 Mary Carlisle as Alicia  
 Bert Roach as Charlie Layton  
 Ethel Clayton as Mrs. Underwood  
 Rockliffe Fellowes as Tierney  
 William Scott as Mills

References

Bibliography
 Monaco, James. The Encyclopedia of Film. Perigee Books, 1991.

External links
 

1932 films
1932 crime films
American crime films
Films directed by Christy Cabanne
American black-and-white films
Tiffany Pictures films
1930s English-language films
1930s American films